Kurtz is an unincorporated community in Owen Township, Jackson County, Indiana.

History
Kurtz is a unincorporated community in Jackson County, Indiana. Its golden period was from 1950 to 1980 with it having an small economy and a moderate amount of residents. The most notable family was that of Arnold Fleetwood and Eva Fleetwood owning a gas station and convenience store. The gas station and convenience store are both no longer running. As of January 2021 Arnold is deceased and Eva's whereabouts are unknown. The name of Kurtz was taken from Colonel Harry Kurtz an attorney for the Evansville & Richmond or E & R Railroad who was instrumental in steering the rail lines through Owen and Salt Creek Townships.

Geography

References

Unincorporated communities in Jackson County, Indiana
Unincorporated communities in Indiana